Hominy Ridge Shelter House is a historic park picnic shelter complex located in the Salamonie River State Forest, Lagro Township, Wabash County, Indiana.  The shelterhouse was built in 1937 by the Civilian Conservation Corps, and is a rectangular Rustic style timber and stone structure with a five sided porch on each end.  Associated with the shelter are 13 stone and timber picnic tables and the remains of a stone wall and an outhouse.

It was listed on the National Register of Historic Places in 1994.

References

Civilian Conservation Corps in Indiana
Park buildings and structures on the National Register of Historic Places in Indiana
Buildings and structures completed in 1937
Buildings and structures in Wabash County, Indiana
National Register of Historic Places in Wabash County, Indiana